Bai Yun (born December 1960) is a Chinese regional politician from Shanxi province. She was the Communist Party Secretary of Yuncheng between 2012 and 2013. Bai was the first female official of provincial-ministerial rank to be investigated for corruption after the 18th National Congress of the Chinese Communist Party. At the time the investigation against her was opened, she was serving as a member of the Shanxi Provincial Party Committee and the Head of the United Front Work Department of Shanxi Province. She was expelled from the Party in 2015 for abuse of power and accepting bribes.

Career
Bai Yun was born and raised in Wutai County, Shanxi, she earned a master's degree in business administration from Renmin University of China in 1997.

Bai Yun became involved in politics in December 1986 and joined the Chinese Communist Party in December 1979.

Beginning in 1984, she served in several posts in Shuozhou, Shanxi, including Communist Youth League Secretary of the municipal party committee, Communist Youth League Vice Secretary of provincial party committee, and Secretary of party committee.

She was appointed as the Deputy Party Secretary of Lüliang in February 2004, a position she held until February 2006, when she was transferred to Yangquan as the Deputy Party Secretary. After two months, she also served as the Mayor. In April 2009, she was promoted to become the Party Secretary, earning full departmental-level (zhengtingji) rank. In January 2012, Bai was named acting Party Secretary of Yuncheng, replacing Gao Weidong. In January 2013, she became a member of the provincial Party Standing Committee. One month later, she was elevated to the head of the United Front Work Department of the provincial Party committee.

Downfall
On August 29, 2014, it was announced that Bai Yun was undergoing investigation by the Central Commission for Discipline Inspection for "serious violations of laws and regulations". Several other provincial Standing Committee members were also investigated as part of a "political earthquake" that shook the province in 2014.

In February 2015, at the conclusion of the internal party investigation, Bai Yun was accused of taking "massive bribes" and abuse of power, and expelled from the Communist Party. Bai was tried at the People's Intermediate Court in Nantong, Jiangsu province. The prosecution accused Bai of taking some 17.81 million yuan (~$2.3 million) in bribes during her term as party chief of Yangquan, from the chief executive of an environmental engineering company and "16 other individuals," in exchange for favourable treatment in the approval of projects and the promotion of subordinates. Bai did not contest the charges. On October 19, 2016, Bai was sentenced to 12 years in prison.

References

1960 births
Living people
People's Republic of China politicians from Shanxi
Politicians from Xinzhou
Political office-holders in Shanxi
Mayors of places in China
Renmin University of China alumni
Expelled members of the Chinese Communist Party
Chinese politicians convicted of corruption
21st-century Chinese women politicians
21st-century Chinese politicians
Chinese Communist Party politicians from Shanxi